Antonio Fondevilla (29 October 1916 – 3 August 1965) was an Argentine sprinter. He competed in the men's 100 metres sprint event at the 1936 Summer Olympics.

References

External links
 

1916 births
1965 deaths
Athletes (track and field) at the 1936 Summer Olympics
Argentine male sprinters
Olympic athletes of Argentina
Place of birth missing
20th-century Argentine people